Vladimir Vladimirovich Pchelnikov (born 30 March 1970) is a Russian professional football coach and a former player. Currently, he works as a goalkeeping coach for FC Spartak-2 Moscow.

Club career
He made his professional debut in the Soviet Top League in 1988 for FC Spartak Moscow. He played 4 games in the UEFA Cup 1996–97 for FC Torpedo Moscow.

Honours
 Russian Cup winner: 1993.

References

1970 births
People from Kandalaksha
Living people
Soviet footballers
Russian footballers
Association football goalkeepers
Russian Premier League players
FC Spartak Moscow players
FC Torpedo Moscow players
FC Torpedo-2 players
FC Tom Tomsk players
FC Fakel Voronezh players
FC Sibir Novosibirsk players
FC Volgar Astrakhan players
FC Lukhovitsy players
Sportspeople from Murmansk Oblast